The 1963-64 NBA season was the Knicks' 18th season in the NBA.

Regular season

Season standings 

x – clinched playoff spot

Record vs. opponents

Game log

Awards and records 
 Art Heyman, NBA All-Rookie Team 1st Team

References 

New York Knicks seasons
New York
Knicks
Knicks
1960s in Manhattan
Madison Square Garden